Pdoc is a software package for generating API documentation for Python programming language. Built as a successor to Epydoc, Pdoc uses introspection to extract documentation from source code docstrings and allows programmers to generate HTML documentation for chosen Python modules. It is thus functionally similar to Pydoc, Perldoc and Javadoc. It supports identifier cross-linking and Markdown for its doc string format.

Forks
A lack of original project activity in 2018-2019 spurred several forks, such as pdoc3 and pdocs, part of the portray suite.

As of 2021, the original pdoc project is active again.

See also

Comparison of documentation generators

References

External links
Official website
Software package on PyPI

Python (programming language) development tools
Free documentation generators
Free software programmed in Python